Wilhelm Reinhard may refer to:

 Wilhelm Reinhard (pilot), World War I German fighter pilot
 Wilhelm Reinhard (SS), German officer of the Schutzstaffel
 Wilhelm Reinhard (theologian) (1860-1922), German theologian